Mahbubul Alam is a Bangladeshi politician in Chapai Nawabganj District. He was elected a member of parliament from Chapai Nawabganj-1 in 1988.

Career 
Alam was elected to parliament from Chapai Nawabganj-1 in 1988 Bangladeshi general election.

References 

People from Chapai Nawabganj district
4th Jatiya Sangsad members